Xenothictis sympaestra is a species of moth of the family Tortricidae. It is found in New Caledonia in the southwest Pacific Ocean. The habitat consists of rainforests.

The wingspan is about 20 mm. The forewings are cream, suffused with ferruginous postmedially. The dots, dorsal and subterminal suffusions are grey-brown. The hindwings are greyish cream, spotted with grey.

Etymology
The species name refers to the close genital similarity to Xenothictis coena and is derived from Greek sympaestra (meaning a companion of play).

References

Moths described in 2013
Archipini